Peter Joseph Cavanagh (born 14 October 1981) is an English football coach and former player who works as a foundation coach at Everton.

Before joining Fleetwood in 2010 he played for Accrington Stanley, where he was made the youngest ever captain of Accrington after joining the club in 2001. He was an England C international in the 2003–04 season. His Accrington career ended in 2009 after he received a ban from the FA for betting against his own team.

Playing career

Accrington Stanley
Cavanagh was born in Bootle, Merseyside, England. He was part of the youth team at Liverpool, but left for Accrington Stanley in September 2001 after realising he did not have a future at Anfield.

He was appointed as captain soon after joining in 2001, and scored 22 goals in 226 league games in an eight-year career. He skippered the club to the Northern Premier League Cup and Lancashire FA Challenge Trophy in 2002, the Northern Premier League title in 2002–03, and Conference National title in 2005–06.

Ban from football
In July 2009, Accrington players Jay Harris, Robert Williams, David Mannix, and Andy Mangan received 5–12-month bans for betting against their own club. Cavanagh's case was held at a later date. On 7 April 2009 Cavanagh was charged by the FA for breaching betting rules, being alleged to have placed a £5 bet on Accrington losing to Bury in the last match of the 2008–09 season. Bury won the match 2–0. On 10 August 2009, he was fined £3,500 and suspended from competitive football for eight months.

Return to football with Fleetwood Town
Following the end of his ban, Cavanagh signed with Fleetwood Town in June 2010.

Rochdale
On 8 June 2012, Cavangh joined Football League Two side Rochdale on a free transfer, linking up with former manager John Coleman.

Altrincham
After his release from Rochdale, Peter joined Altrincham.

Southport
He then signed for Southport in May 2015 as a player coach alongside manager Paul Carden.

Retirement and coaching career

Everton

Shortly after joining Southport, Cavanagh took up a full-time post as a foundation coach at Everton, retiring from playing to focus on this stage of his career.

References

External links

1981 births
Living people
Sportspeople from Bootle
Association football fullbacks
English footballers
England semi-pro international footballers
Liverpool F.C. players
Accrington Stanley F.C. players
Fleetwood Town F.C. players
Rochdale A.F.C. players
Altrincham F.C. players
National League (English football) players
English Football League players
Everton F.C. non-playing staff
Sportspeople involved in betting scandals